Mount Waas is a peak in Grand County, Utah in the United States. It is the highest point of Grand County and is part of the La Sal Mountains.

See also
List of mountain peaks of Utah

References

Mountains of Utah
Mountains of Grand County, Utah
North American 3000 m summits